Jesse Väkelä (born 9 July 1995) is a Finnish professional ice hockey player for KoMu HT of the 2. Divisioona.

He previously played for Hokki of the Finnish Mestis.

Väkelä made his Liiga debut playing with Vaasan Sport during the 2014-15 Liiga season.

References

External links

1995 births
Living people
Vaasan Sport players
Hokki players
Peliitat Heinola players
Finnish ice hockey defencemen
Sportspeople from Vaasa